Adventure World (ja: 白浜アドベンチャーワールド, Shirahama Adventure World) is a theme park that integrates a zoo, a public aquarium, and an amusement park in the town on Shirahama, Wakayama Prefecture, Japan.
It is operated by Hours Co., Ltd. (AWS), an affiliate of Marusue Co., Ltd. (real estate / construction industry) headquartered in Matsubara City, Osaka Prefecture.
When it first opened on April 22, 1978, it was called "Nanki Shirahama World Safari."

Overview
Under the theme of "contact between humans, animals, and nature," facility will take on new challenges every day. It is a theme park with a style that is rare in Japan, with a zoo, an aquarium, and an amusement park.
There are many facilities in the park, including a giant panda breeding exhibition and dolphin and sea lion shows.

There are animal-themed restaurants and cafes in the park, as well as academic tours.

In January 2023, two lions at Adventure World died of COVID-19 after contact with an infected employee. Eight other lions became sick as well but recovered.

Zoo

 Safari World-Carnivore Zone, Herbivore Zone Tour
 Panda Love-Giant Panda Exhibition Facility
 Breeding Center-Giant panda breeding facility
 Wanwan Garden-Yeinu
 Fureai Square-Pygmy hippopotamus, capybara, small monkeys, chimpanzee, poultry, parakeets, etc.
 Fureai no Sato Red Wood Images
 Flamingo Square-In addition to Flamingo, there is also red pandas.
 Elephant Fureai Square-Asian Elephant is here.
 HORSE CAMP-horses, birds of prey

Giant Panda

Adventure World operates as the Japan branch of the Giant Panda Breeding Research Base in Chengdu, Chengdu, China. In the giant panda breeding research project, which is being promoted in cooperation with the base, 17 breeding records have been achieved by September 2018, and 15 have been raised by June 2017. This is the highest number in the world in terms of both the number of live births and the number of grown-up children, except for mainland China. It is also the first facility to successfully raise both twin giant pandas outside of China (Spain, which is affiliated with the Chengdu Great Bear Cat Breeding Research Base on September 7, 2010, as in Adventure World. Twin giant pandas were born at the Madrid Zoo in Spain. The two are growing safely as of January 10, 2011).

In Japan, as of September 12, 2018, 10 giant pandas are captivity, including 3 from Ueno Zoo, 1 from Kobe Oji Zoo, and 6 from Adventure World. In Adventure World, you can also see giant pandas spending their time freely in a space without a roof. I live in a rare animal center, PANDA LOVE, and a bleeding center.

As mentioned above, Adventure World also serves as the Japanese branch of the Chengdu Great Bear Cat Breeding Research Base, so all the giant pandas currently captivity, including children, are owned by the Chengdu Great Bear Cat Breeding Research Base Headquarters in China. is there.

In Shirahama Town, this giant panda is positioned as the largest material for attracting customers, and the Shirahama Town Hall is posting "Panda Town Shirahama".

A panda seat (seat for shooting) is installed in the 381 series used for the limited express Kuroshio running in the local area, and as of August 1, 2018, a train with an illustration of a giant panda is in operation. In addition, the Meiko Bus, which operates a fixed-route bus, operates a bus with an illustration of a giant panda (as of October 9, 2010, one bus is in operation).

The second letter of all names is unified to "hin(浜)". Eimei has 14 fathers, except for the 1st Yoshihama and the 6th panda who died shortly after birth. In Eimei, there was a child (Ranbao, Rambao, male) born in 2002 at the Lanzhou Zoo in China by artificial insemination with the twin sisters of Umeume (Ran, Shulan), but in August 2012. He died for 30 days.

Currently captivity giant panda
Yu Aimei was born on September 14, 1992, at the Beijing Zoo (China), and visited the park on September 6, 1994.
Rauhin female, born on September 6, 2000, at Adventure World (father: Hajime, mother: Umeume)
Ouhin female, born on December 2, 2014, at Adventure World (father: Eimei, mother: Yoshihama, twin sister)
Touhin female, born on December 2, 2014, at Adventure World (father: Eimei, mother: Yoshihama, twin sister)
Yuihin female, born on September 18, 2016, at Adventure World (father: Eimei, mother: Yoshihama)
Saihin Female ・ Born at Adventure World on August 14, 2018 (father: Eimei, mother: Yoshihama) Born as twins, but the second one before dawn on the 16th, about 29 hours after the first *birth. Stillbirth turned out.
Kaedehama (Fuhin) Female ・ Born at Adventure World on November 22, 2020 (Father: Eimei, Mother: Yoshihama) Gender was determined to be male, but became female on December 22, one month after birth. correction. We are looking for names from the 24th to the 23rd of February next year. On March 2, 2021, three name candidates ("Kohin", "Shohin", and "Fuhin") were announced, and votes were held on the Internet from the 4th to the 11th of the following day. On March 18, Kaedehama, who received the most votes, was decided.

Giant pandas that were captivity in the past

Xin Xin male, temporary borrowed, captivity at Adventure World from September 19, 1988 (returned to China on January 10, 1989)
Keikei Female, temporary borrowing, captivity in Adventure World from September 19, 1988 (returned to China on January 10, 1989)
Yohin Female, born on September 4, 1992, at Chengdu Zoo (died at Adventure World on July 17, 1997)
Mei Mei Female ・ Born August 31, 1994, at Chengdu Okuma Cat Breeding Research Base (China),captivity in Adventure World from July 7, 2000 [11] (Wednesday, October 15, 2008) Died at Adventure World at 5:29
Yuhin Yuhin was born on December 17, 2001, at Adventure World (father: Eimei, mother: Umeume, to Chengdu Okumaneko Breeding Research Base Headquarters (Chengdu) on June 21, 2004)
Ryuhin Yu, born on September 8, 2003, at Adventure World (father: Eimei, mother: Umeume, to Chengdu on October 27, 2007)
Yu Akihama, born on September 8, 2003, at Adventure World (same as above / Ryuhin and twins, to Chengdu on October 27, 2007)
Kouhin Yu, born at Adventure World on August 23, 2005 (father: Eimei, mother: Umeume, to Chengdu on March 15, 2010)
(No name) Male, born on August 24, 2005, at Adventure World (father: Eimei, mother: Umeume, died on August 25, 2005: Kouhin and twins *)
Aihin Female, born on December 23, 2006, at Adventure World (father: Eimei, mother: Umeume, to Chengdu on December 14, 2012)
Yu Meihin, born at Adventure World on December 23, 2006 (same as above / Aihin and twins, to Chengdu on December 14, 2012, to Ryushu Zoo in 2014)
Meihin female, born on September 13, 2008, at Adventure World (father: Eimei, mother: Yoshihama, to Chengdu on February 26, 2013)
Eihin Male, born at Adventure World on September 13, 2008 (same as above / Meihin and twins, to Chengdu on February 26, 2013)
Kaihin Male, born on August 11, 2010, at Adventure World (father: Eimei, mother: Yoshihama, to Chengdu on June 5, 2017)
Youhin female, born on August 11, 2010, at Adventure World (same as above / Kaihin and twins, to Chengdu on June 5, 2017)
Yuhin female, born on August 10, 2012, at Adventure World (father: Eimei, mother: Yoshihama, twins but stillborn, to Chengdu on June 5, 2017)
 Kouhin's twin brother was born on August 24, 2005, at 4:09 am. He weighed 66g at birth, which was very small, and died at 2:27 am on August 25, the following day. Although it was a life of less than 24 hours, Adventure World officially announced that Aihin and Akihama were the 7th and 8th Adventure World-born, and although there is no name, this late brother Giant Panda was born in Adventure World. This is the sixth giant panda with a history.
 The twins Meihin and Nagahama, born on September 13, 2008, are the first giant pandas in Japan to be in captivity for the third generation (Meihin-Ryohama-Meihin / Nagahama).
 In March 2011, Yoshinobu Nisaka, the governor of Wakayama Prefecture, gave the title of "Kunkousaku = Wakayama Night" to the three horses, Eimei, Yoshihama, and Umeume. This is the second case following the Tama station manager at Kishi Station on the Wakayama Electric Railway Kishigawa Line, and it is a tribute to the nationwide dissemination of the charm of Wakayama Prefecture by increasing the number of panda families.

Public aquarium

 Sea Animal Museum-In an indoor aquarium Polar bear, Penguins, Fur seal, Seal Exhibitions such as
 Penguin Kingdom-Penguins, Sea Otters Exhibition
 Big Ocean-Dolphin and Whale shows, etc.
 Marine Wave-A contact event with Dolphin, etc.
 Animal Land-Sea Lion and Otter shows, etc.

Marine Live & Animal Action 
The dolphin and whale show is called "Marine Live" and is held in a pool with a tank capacity of (width , depth , water depth ).
The sea lion show will be held at a show called "Animal Action".

Rearing polar bears 
On October 20, 2009, it was announced that "a female baby was born on October 13," and was named Mirai, but she died on May 16, 2014, so she is no longer seen. In 2013, a male baby was born. Since a male Arctic died of liver cancer in 2014, it was decided to borrow Polar bear Gogo(male) from Tennoji Zoo in March 2015.

Penguins captivity and breeding 

Penguin is divided into eight types (Emperor Penguin, King Penguin, Gentoo Penguin, Adelie Penguin, Chinstrap penguin, Rockhopper penguin, Cape penguin, Fairy penguin). Approximately 470 birds　are bred, which is one of the largest in the world.

In particular, Emperor Penguins have been successfully hatched and bred.

On October 1, 2019, the facility hatched the 13th Emperor Penguin chick.

Killer whale captivity 

The killer whale show was once famous, but it is no longer held due to the death of the last individual in 2005.

The first killer whales were brought in from Six Flags Discovery Kingdom in USA and California five days before opening in 1978. It was "Kianu" (female, body length 6m, weight 3t).

After that, only one of the "Goro" (male brought in from Taiji Town in 1985) remained, but on 18 January 2005 he fell ill and on 21 March he died at 9:20 pm. In addition, individuals such as "Benkei," "Ushiwaka," "Ruka," and "Ai" were also bred intermittently. The four sperms and eggs of Ruka, Goro, Ran, and Kyu that were bred at the end of life are preserved after death in preparation for future artificial insemination.

See also
Giant pandas around the world
List of giant pandas

References

External links
 Official Site 
 Official Site 

Zoos in Japan
Aquaria in Japan
Animal theme parks
Amusement parks in Japan
Amusement parks opened in 1978
Zoos established in 1978
1978 establishments in Japan
Shirahama, Wakayama
Buildings and structures in Wakayama Prefecture
Tourist attractions in Wakayama Prefecture